In public transport, Route 2 may refer to:

Barcelona Metro line 2
NWFB Route 2 in Hong Kong
London Buses route 2
Line 2 (Madrid Metro)
Line 2 Orange (Montreal Metro)
2 (New York City Subway service)
Seoul Subway Line 2
Shanghai Metro Line 2

2